Chania High School was a public high school located in Thika, in the Central Province of Kenya.

History and operations
The school was formerly known as MP Shah High School until 1967 when it was renamed Chania High School. It used to have both girls and boys, both of whom could board at the school or commute to school every day. It was the only school in Thika that served a wide range of students from a diverse cultural, racial, ethnic and religious background.

The school split in 2000 to Chania Boys' High School and Chania Girls' High School to serve boys and girls, respectively.

The school motto was Esse Quam Videri, meaning "To be, rather than to seem (to be)".

See also

 Education in Kenya
 List of boarding schools
 List of schools in Kenya

References

1967 establishments in Africa
1967 establishments in Kenya
2000 disestablishments in Africa
2000s disestablishments in Kenya
Boarding schools in Kenya
Co-educational boarding schools
Defunct high schools
Defunct public schools
Defunct schools in Kenya
Education in Central Province (Kenya)
Educational institutions established in 1967
Educational institutions disestablished in 2000
Thika